The Schrofen Pass is a  pedestrian pass (el. 1,688 m) across the Allgäu Alps. It connects Oberstdorf in Germany with Warth in Austria.

External links
Picture of the Schrofen Pass

Mountain passes of the Alps
Mountain passes of Vorarlberg
Mountain passes of Bavaria
Austria–Germany border crossings
Hiking trails in Austria
Hiking trails in Bavaria